is a Japanese footballer currently playing as a defender for Croatian side Križevci.

Career statistics

Club
.

Notes

References

2000 births
Living people
Association football people from Hyōgo Prefecture
Japanese footballers
Association football defenders
Singapore Premier League players
Albirex Niigata Singapore FC players
NK Križevci players
Japanese expatriate footballers
Japanese expatriate sportspeople in Singapore
Expatriate footballers in Singapore
Japanese expatriate sportspeople in Croatia
Expatriate footballers in Croatia